The 1901 West Virginia Mountaineers football team was an American football team that represented West Virginia University as an independent during the 1901 college football season. In its second non-consecutive season under head coach Lewis Yeager, the team compiled a 3–2 record and outscored opponents by a total of 73 to 34. Milton S. Hodges was the team captain.

Schedule

References

West Virginia
West Virginia Mountaineers football seasons
West Virginia Mountaineers football